was an important member of the Gutai Group's younger generation having joined the group in 1965. His 'Paintings of Propagation' theory was a crucial step in his early career. He was included in the important retrospectives on the Gutai Group at the Solomon R. Guggenheim Museum in New York in 2013 and the National Art Center in Tokyo in 2012.

Biography 
Minoru Onoda was born 1937 in Manshu, North-East District, China (Japanese-occupied Manchuria Jilin Province, China). He studied at the Institute of Fine Arts, Osaka, Japan from 1956 to 1958 and from 1958–1960 at the Osaka School of Art (currently Osaka College of Art). He lived most of his life in Himeji, Japan where he died in 2008.

After publishing his "Paintings of Propagation' theory in 1961 and participating in the 3rd International Exhibition for Young Artists in Paris in 1964, Onoda Minoru joined Gutai and stayed faithful to their leader Yoshihara Jiro's motto to "do what has never been done before" for the rest of his career. The Gutai Group was the first radical artistic movement after World War II in Japan. This influential group was involved in large-scale multimedia environments, performances, and theatrical events and emphasizes the relationship between body and matter in pursuit of originality.

Through newly-available materials and artistic freedom post WWII, Onoda questioned new forms, styles and hierarchy through lines and circles.

Awed by manufacturing concepts of repetition and quantity, he chose amalgamations of gradually-sized dots on panel with relief, creating organically-growing shapes, progressing to infinite circles and finally monochrome painting where the edge matters.

During his lifetime Onoda chose to sell primarily to museums and institutions. His paintings have been extensively exhibited in Japan and were included in the major retrospectives: "Gutai, The Spirit of an Era", National Art Center Tokyo, in 2012 and  "Gutai : Splendid Playground” at the Solomon R. Guggenheim Museum, New York, in 2013.

A Monograph on the artist containing 232 pages and over 170 photographs was published in 2019 by Anne Mosseri-Marlio Galerie through the publisher Scheidegger & Spiess. in English and Japanese.

Selected solo exhibitions

Selected recent group exhibitions

Permanent installations, museum and public collections 
Museum Boijmans Van Beuningen, Rotterdam, NL

Hyogo Prefectural Museum of Art, Kobe, JP

Himeji City Gallery, Himeji, JP

Ashiya City Museum of Art and History, Ashiya, JP

The Miyagi Museum of Art, JP

HOLE・CUT・LIGHT, Nissan Corporation, Himeji, JP

Literature monument of Rinzo Shiina, Himeji, JP

Himeji City Hall, Himeji, JP

Himeji Kohryo Junior High School, Himeji, JP

Art Kite Museum, DE

Private collections in Japan, US, UK and Switzerland

Awards

External links 
 Website about the work of Minoru Onoda
 Article in the Financial Times with picture, June 17, 2017
 Article in Hyperallergic, June 17, 2017

Major catalogues 
Alexandra Munroe and Ming Tiampo - Gutai: Splendid Playground, published by Guggenheim Museum Publications, New York  
 Ming Tiampo - Gutai: Decentering Modernism, published by University of Chicago Press , 
 Onoda Minoru no sekai ten : gendai kyōdo sakkaten, Catalog of an exhibition held at Himeji Shiritsu Bijutsukan, Jan. 9-30, 2004
 Art Kites: Pictures for the Sky/Kunstdrachen. Bilder für den Himmel, Haus der Kunst, Munich, 1989

Japanese contemporary artists
Gutai group member artists